Opportunistic TLS (Transport Layer Security) refers to extensions in plain text communication protocols, which offer a way to upgrade a plain text connection to an encrypted (TLS or SSL) connection instead of using a separate port for encrypted communication. Several protocols use a command named "STARTTLS" for this purpose. It is a form of opportunistic encryption and is primarily intended as a countermeasure to passive monitoring.

For IRC, the IRCv3 Working Group has defined the STARTTLS extension. HTTP uses upgrade header.

Layering
TLS is application-neutral; in the words of :

One advantage of TLS is that it is application protocol independent. Higher-level protocols can layer on top of the TLS protocol transparently.  The TLS standard, however, does not specify how protocols add security with TLS; the decisions on how to initiate TLS handshaking and how to interpret the authentication certificates exchanged are left to the judgment of the designers and implementors of protocols that run on top of TLS.

The style used to specify how to use TLS matches the same layer distinction that is also  conveniently supported by several library implementations of TLS. E.g., the  SMTP extension illustrates with the following dialog how a client and server can start a secure session:

   S: <waits for connection on TCP port 25>
   C: <opens connection>
   S: 220 mail.example.org ESMTP service ready
   C: EHLO client.example.org
   S: 250-mail.example.org offers a warm hug of welcome
   S: 250 STARTTLS
   C: STARTTLS
   S: 220 Go ahead
   C: <starts TLS negotiation>
   C & S: <negotiate a TLS session>
   C & S: <check result of negotiation>
   C: EHLO client.example.org
   . . .

The last EHLO command above is issued over a secure channel. Note that authentication is optional in SMTP, and the omitted server reply may now safely advertise an AUTH PLAIN SMTP extension, which is not present in the plain-text reply.

SSL ports 

Besides the use of opportunistic TLS, a number of TCP ports were defined for SSL-secured versions of well-known protocols. These establish secure communications and then present a communication stream identical to the old un-encrypted protocol. Separate SSL ports have the advantage of fewer round-trips; also less meta-data is transmitted in unencrypted form. Some examples include:

At least for the email related protocols,  favors separate SSL ports instead of STARTTLS.

Weaknesses and mitigations 
Opportunistic TLS is an opportunistic encryption mechanism. Because the initial handshake takes place in plain text, an attacker in control of the network can modify the server messages via a man-in-the-middle attack to make it appear that TLS is unavailable (called a STRIPTLS attack). Most SMTP clients will then send the email and possibly passwords in plain text, often with no notification to the user. In particular, many SMTP connections occur between mail servers, where user notification is not practical.

In September 2014, two ISPs in Thailand were found to be doing this to their own customers. In October 2014, Cricket Wireless, a subsidiary of AT&T, was revealed to be doing this to their customers. This behavior started as early as September 2013 by Aio Wireless, who later merged with Cricket where the practice continued.

STRIPTLS attacks can be blocked by configuring SMTP clients to require TLS for outgoing connections (for example, the Exim Message transfer agent can require TLS via the directive "hosts_require_tls"). However, since not every mail server supports TLS, it is not practical to simply require TLS for all connections.

An example of a STRIPTLS attack of the type used in Thai mass surveillance technology:

    220 smtp.gmail.com ESMTP mail.redacted.com - gsmtp
    ehlo a
    250-smtp.gmail.com at your service, [REDACTED SERVICE]
    250-SIZE 35882577
    250-8BITMIME
    # The STARTTLS command is stripped here
    250-ENHANCEDSTATUSCODES
    250-PIPELINING
    250 SMTPUTF8

    220 smtp.gmail.com ESMTP - gsmtp
    ehlo a
    250-smtp.gmail.com at your service
    250-SIZE 35882577
    250-8BITMIME
    250-STARTTLS
    250-ENHANCEDSTATUSCODES
    250-PIPELINING
    250 SMTPUTF8

DANE allows to advertise support for secure SMTP via a TLSA record. This tells connecting clients they should require TLS, thus preventing STRIPTLS attacks. The STARTTLS Everywhere project from the Electronic Frontier Foundation works in a similar way. However, DNSSEC, due to deployment complexities and peculiar criticism, faced a low adoption rate and a new protocol called SMTP MTA Strict Transport Security or MTA-STS has been drafted by a group of major email service providers including Microsoft, Google and Yahoo. MTA-STS does not require the use of DNSSEC to authenticate DANE TLSA records but relies on the certificate authority (CA) system and a trust-on-first-use (TOFU) approach to avoid interceptions. The TOFU model reduces complexity but without the guarantees on first use offered by DNSSEC. In addition, MTA-STS introduces a mechanism for failure reporting and a report-only mode, enabling progressive roll-out and auditing for compliance.

Popularity 

Following the revelations made by Edward Snowden in light of the global mass surveillance scandal, popular email providers have bettered their email security by enabling STARTTLS. Facebook reported that after enabling STARTTLS and encouraging other providers to do the same, until Facebook discontinued its email service in February 2014, 95% of outbound email was encrypted with both Perfect Forward Secrecy and strict certificate validation.

References

External links
 Secure Email Tests and Tools verify STARTTLS in real-time dialog like example above
 Verify if a receiving domain has STARTTLS enabled for email and with which security level
  A mechanism enabling mail service providers to declare their ability to receive Transport Layer Security (TLS) secure SMTP connections.

Internet mail protocols
Transport Layer Security

fr:StartTLS